Russelva is a settlement in Kvalsund, Norway, located at the mouth of Russelva.

Villages in Finnmark
Kvalsund